is the remains of a castle structure in Sakaki, Nagano Prefecture, Japan. It is located on a 816-meter mountain. The castle was a main bastion of the Murakami clan.

In, 1553, the castle was attacked by Takeda Shingen, Murakami Yoshikiyo abandoned the castle and fled to Echigo, seeking Nagao Kagetora's help. As a result, the Battle of Kawanakajima happened.

Its ruins have been protected as a Prefectural Historic Sites. The site is now only ruins, with some stone walls, moats, and earthworks.

See also
List of Historic Sites of Japan (Nagano)

References

Castles in Nagano Prefecture
Historic Sites of Japan
Former castles in Japan
Takeda clan
Ruined castles in Japan